The 13th Pan American Games were held in Mar del Plata, Argentina from March 11 to March 26, 1995.

Medals

Gold

Men's Light Flyweight (– 48 kg): Edgar Velasquez

Men's Vault: Víctor Solorzano

Men's 200 m Butterfly: Nelson Mora

Women's – 51 kg: Eliana Pantoja
Women's – 55 kg: Oly Padron
Women's + 70 kg: Adriana Carmona

Men's Light-Heavyweight (– 83 kg): Julio César Luña

Silver

Men's All-Events: Pedro Carreyo
Men's Teams: Agustin de Farias, Pedro Avendano, Arturo Hernández, and Pedro Carreyo
Women's Singles: Mariela Alarza

Women's Half Heavyweight (– 72 kg): Francis Gómez

Men's – 58 kg: Yosvani Pérez
Men's – 70 kg: Quidio Quero

Bronze

Men's Flyweight (– 51 kg): José Luis Lopez

Men's All-Events: Agustin de Farias
Women's Doubles: Margalit Mizrachi and Mariela Alarza
Women's Teams: Margalit Mizrachi, Mariela Alarza, Marianela Lista, and Mirella Trasolini

Women's Extra Lightweight (– 48 kg): María Villapol
Women's Half Middleweight (– 61 kg): Xiomara Griffith

Men's 4 × 100 m Freestyle: Venezuela

Women's Solo: María Elena Giusti

Women's – 65 kg: Ohdra Malpica

Men's Featherweight (– 64 kg): Henry Blanco 
Men's Heavyweight (– 108 kg): Pedro Marin

See also
 Venezuela at the 1996 Summer Olympics

Nations at the 1995 Pan American Games
P
1995